The men's 200 metres event at the 2016 Summer Olympics took place between 16–18 August in Rio de Janeiro, Brazil, at the Estádio Olímpico João Havelange. There were 77 competitors from 48 nations. The event was won by Usain Bolt of Jamaica, his third consecutive gold medal in the event. Bolt earned his eighth overall gold, needing only the 4x100 metres relay the next day to complete the sprint triple-triple. It was Jamaica's fourth victory in the event, second-most among nations. Andre De Grasse earned Canada's first medal in the event since 1928 with his silver; Christophe Lemaitre's bronze was France's first since 1960. The United States missed the podium for only the fifth time in the history of the men's 200 metres; it was the first time that it had done so in consecutive Games.

Background

This was the 27th appearance of the event, which was not held at the first Olympics in 1896 but has been on the program ever since. Five of the eight finalists from the 2012 Games returned: two-time gold medalist Usain Bolt of Jamaica, silver medalist Yohan Blake of Jamaica, fifth-place finisher Churandy Martina of the Netherlands (who had finished second in 2008 before being disqualified for a lane violation), sixth-place finisher Christophe Lemaitre of France, and eighth-place finisher Anaso Jobodwana of South Africa.

After winning the 100 metres, 2012 Olympic champion and 2015 World Champion Bolt sought to become the first man to win three consecutive Olympic 200 metres titles (no other man had won even two), en route to the "Triple-Triple"; 100 metres, 200 metres and 4 × 100 metres relay gold medals at 3 consecutive Olympic Games. However, injuries in the early season prevented him from running any 200 metres races before the Jamaican Trials, where he pulled from the event due to an injury. Bolt filed a medical exemption and qualified for the Olympics by running 19.89 seconds in London, ranking him 5th in the year. Though unbeaten in the event since 2012, Bolt faced major opposition from a strong trio of Americans in LaShawn Merritt, Justin Gatlin, and Ameer Webb. Merritt, the 2008 Olympic Champion in the 400 metres, posted the 19.74 second world lead in the semifinals of the American Trials, while Gatlin, Bolt's main rival for the past 3 years, beat him in the final with the second fastest time of the year at 19.75 seconds. Webb clocked 19.85 seconds in Doha and won in Rome as well.

Bolt's training partners Blake and Miguel Francis of Antigua and Barbuda were entered, with Francis being ranked 4th at 19.88 seconds. Defending silver medalist Blake, the second fastest man in history and the only man to beat Bolt in the 200 metres since his world record, failed to go under 20 seconds in the season, still on the comeback from near-career ending injuries from 2013-2015. In Bolt's absence, he won the Jamaican Trials in a modest 20.29 seconds. Nickel Ashmeade rounded out the Jamaican trio while defending bronze medalist Warren Weir failed to make the team. Nethaneel Mitchell-Blake clocked a personal best of 19.95 seconds earlier in the season; Adam Gemili and Daniel Talbot filled out the British team. Brendon Rodney was the last one under 20 seconds in the season, leading Aaron Brown and Pan-American champion Andre De Grasse on the Canadian team. Others included in the conversation were Diamond League champion Alonso Edward of Panama, European Champion Bruno Hortelano of Spain, and 2012 European Champion Martina.

Summary

De Grasse, fresh off his bronze in the 100 metres, led the quarterfinals with a very relaxed 20.09, throwing his hat into the ring as a potential challenger. Bolt eased to 20.28 seconds, while a sluggish Gatlin clocked 20.42 seconds. Surprise winners included Salem Eid Yaqoob, Jose Carlos Herrera, and Nery Brenes, while notable eliminations included Rodney, Asian record holder Femi Ogunode, and reigning world championship bronze medalist Anaso Jobodwana.

In the semifinal round, Merritt cruised to a sub-20 win in the first. 2011 bronze medalist Christophe Lemaitre finished second with his fastest time in 4 years. In the second semifinal, Bolt was prepared to cruise to victory until De Grasse suddenly rushed to Bolt's shoulder. The two friends laughed with each other to the line, with Bolt clocking a season's best 19.78 seconds and De Grasse breaking his Canadian record with 19.80 seconds. As Bud Winter, the sprint coach who influenced Glen Mills, Bolt's coach, would say; "Relax and win." Webb meanwhile, was left behind in 6th. Drama unfolded in the third semifinal, with both major contenders Gatlin and Blake failing to qualify. Instead, Alonso Edward led the way with Churandy Martina making a late rush for the second spot. Gatlin maintained a lead up until the homestretch, while Blake never got close to contention and finished a surprising 6th.

The final was held following a light rainstorm that affected the women's javelin throw. The track was still wet and conditions cooler. Still the stadium was electric to see lightning, the star Usain Bolt in what was expected to be his last individual race in the Olympics. Bolt was in lane 6, playing to the camera and to the crowd before the race. Lemaitre and Martina were to his outside, while Merritt and De Grasse, now in major contention, to his inside. Bolt got a good start and quickly made up the stagger on Lemaitre then Martina halfway through the turn. He led by a meter by the time they came into the homestretch, and after extending it to 2.5 metres, there was no challenge and Bolt was home free from a wall of chasers. Behind him, De Grasse started to pull away from the pack, Merritt started to lag, and Gemili and Martina were in contention for the bronze, with Lemaitre beginning to make a late charge. Bolt, however, was clear and away, gritting his teeth hard in an attempt to close on his world record. He hit the line in 19.78 seconds, equaling his time from the semifinals, visibly disappointed. Still though, the crowd lit up in excitement to see Bolt make history once again. Meanwhile, De Grasse cruised to the silver while Gemili, Lemaitre, and Martina all hit the line together in a dead heat for the bronze medal.

Bolt made his goal of being the first man in history to win 3 consecutive Olympic golds in the 200 metres. He also completed the "Triple-Double" with his 100 metres golds as well, and was now one race away from completing the historic "Triple-Triple". As Bolt celebrated, the crowd lit up as Lemaitre was revealed to be the bronze medalist, pipping Gemili by 3 thousandths and Martina by another 3. A heartbroken Gemili laid on the track in tears, then joined his fellow European athletes. The final was one of the slowest in nearly 2 decades, likely due to the rainy conditions. Every athlete other than Bolt was nearly a tenth slower than they were in the semifinals, and only Bolt went under 20 seconds.

After the race, Bolt celebrated his last individual victory, kissing the finish line and striking the lightning bolt pose.

In the victory ceremony, the medals for the competition were presented by Sir Philip Craven, Great Britain, member of the International Olympic Committee and president of the International Paralympic Committee, and the gifts were presented by Adille Sumariwalla, Council Member of the IAAF.

Qualification

A National Olympic Committee (NOC) could enter up to 3 qualified athletes in the men's 200 metres event if all athletes meet the entry standard during the qualifying period. (The limit of 3 has been in place since the 1930 Olympic Congress.) The qualifying standard was 20.50 seconds. The qualifying period was from 1 May 2015 to 11 July 2016. The qualifying time standards could be obtained in various meets during the given period that have the approval of the IAAF. Only outdoor meets were eligible for the sprints and short hurdles, including the 200 metres. NOCs could also use their universality place—each NOC could enter one male athlete regardless of time if they had no male athletes meeting the entry standard for an athletics event—in the 200 metres.

Competition format

The competition featured three rounds: a quarterfinals stage with ten races, three semifinal races, and a single final. Each race featured eight athletes. The top two from each quarterfinal and the next four fastest overall progressed to the semifinals. The top two finishers in each of the three semifinals reach the final, alongside the next two fastest overall.

Records

Before this competition, the existing world and Olympic records were as follows.

The following national records were established during the competition:

Schedule

All times are Brasilia Time (UTC-3)

Results

Quarterfinals

Qualification rules: First 2 in each heat (Q) and the next 4 fastest (q) advance to the semifinals.

Quarterfinal 1

Quarterfinal 2

Quarterfinal 3

Quarterfinal 4

Quarterfinal 5

Quarterfinal 6

Quarterfinal 7

Quarterfinal 8

Quarterfinal 9

Quarterfinal 10

Semifinals

Qualification rules: First 2 in each heat (Q) and the next 2 fastest (q) advance to the final.

Semifinal 1

Semifinal 2

Semifinal 3

Final

References

Men's 200 metres
2016
Men's events at the 2016 Summer Olympics